Trachelipus rathkii, also known as Rathke's Woodlouse, is a species of woodlouse in the genus Trachelipus (family Trachelipodidae). It can be found across Europe, except in the Mediterranean Basin. It has also been introduced to North America, where it can be found across most of the northern half of the United States and southern Canada.

References

External links

Trachelipodidae
Woodlice of Europe
Crustaceans described in 1833